Tobi 19 - Coptic Calendar - Tobi 21

The twentieth day of the Coptic month of Tobi, the fifth month of the Coptic year. On a common year, this day corresponds to January 15, of the Julian Calendar, and January 28, of the Gregorian Calendar. This day falls in the Coptic Season of Shemu, the season of the Harvest.

Commemorations

Saints 

 The departure of Saint Prochorus, one of the Seventy Apostles
 The martyrdom of Saint Kloag, the Priest 
 The martyrdom of Saint Behna

Other commemorations 

 The consecration of the Church of Saint John, the Owner of the Golden Gospel, and the relocation of his Relics to it.

References 

Days of the Coptic calendar